Ardcarn Mound is a mound and ringfort and National Monument located in County Roscommon, Ireland.

Location

History and description
Ardcarn Mound is a bowl barrow. Immediately to the west of this is a trivallate ringfort with souterrain, and to the south of that is a simple rath.

References

National Monuments in County Roscommon
Archaeological sites in County Roscommon
Tumuli in Ireland